Talking Heads: 77 is the debut studio album by American rock band Talking Heads. It was recorded in April 1977 at New York's Sundragon Studios and released on September 16 of that year by Sire Records. The single "Psycho Killer" reached number 92 on the Billboard Hot 100.

Labels and demos
From the group's earliest days as a trio in 1975, Talking Heads were approached by several record labels for a potential album deal. The first person to approach the band was Mark Spector for Columbia Records, who saw Talking Heads perform at CBGB and invited them to record a demo album. Next would come Mathew Kaufman for Beserkley Records. Kaufman brought the trio to K&K Studios in Great Neck, Long Island, to record a three-song, 16-track demo tape containing "Artists Only", "Psycho Killer" and "First Week, Last Week". Kaufman was pleased with the results, but the band felt that they would need to improve drastically before re-entering a recording studio. The group also sent the Columbia demo to Arista Records, but when drummer Chris Frantz called Bob Feilden about it a few weeks later, he claimed the tape was lost.

In November 1975, Seymour Stein, a representative of Sire Records, had heard Talking Heads open for the Ramones. He liked the song "Love → Building on Fire", and the next day, offered a record deal, but the group was still unsure about their studio abilities, and wanted a second guitarist as well as a keyboard player to help improve their sound. They agreed to let him know when they felt more confident.

A month later, Lou Reed, who had seen a few Talking Heads shows at CBGB, invited the trio to his New York apartment, where he began to critique the group's act, telling them to slow down "Tentative Decisions", which had originally been fast and bass-heavy. Reed also suggested to David Byrne that he never wear short sleeves on stage, in order to hide his hairy arms. Over breakfast at a local restaurant, Reed expressed a desire to produce the group's first album and wanted to introduce them to his manager, Jonny Podell. That same day Podell called the trio to meet at his office, where he immediately offered them a recording contract.

To assist with the contracting, the group sought out assistance from lawyer Peter Parcher, a friend of Frantz's father. The next day, the trio visited Parcher's office, where Parcher asked his partner Alan Shulman to look over the contract. Shulman told the group not to sign the deal, or else Reed and Podell would own full rights to the album and collect all profit. Talking Heads declined the deal, but maintained a respectful relationship with Reed.

Around August 1976, Chris Frantz was given the number of Jerry Harrison by former Modern Lovers bass player Ernie Brooks. Brooks assured Frantz that Harrison was not only a great keyboard player, but was a great guitarist too, two things the band were seeking out. When Frantz called Harrison, he was still feeling burnt out from the demise of the original Modern Lovers and had just enrolled at a Harvard Graduate School, and was unsure about joining a new band. But after discovering that several labels were interested in signing the group, he agreed to hear them  play live. Frantz booked a concert local to Harrison in Cambridge, Massachusetts. When the group began to perform, they found Harrison nowhere in sight, but eventually saw him mid-set, seriously observing the band, and appearing displeased. After the show, Frantz asked Harrison what he had thought. Harrison did not answer until the next day, saying he was not impressed by the show, but was intrigued. He said he would like to jam in New York but stipulated that he would not officially join until they had secured a recording deal.

During late September the group began to consider Sire Records again, and asked advice from Danny Fields, the Ramones' manager. Fields praised Sire despite them having the normal flaws of a record label. On November 1 the trio met with Seymour Stein again at Shulman's office, and signed a recording deal with Sire, with an advance allowing the trio to make music their full-time career.

Recording 
Sessions started at Sundragon Recording Studios in late 1976, where the group recorded the track "New Feeling" and the single, "Love → Building on Fire".  Jerry Harrison was not present at these sessions, as he had not yet been informed that the group had received a record deal. These sessions were produced by Tony Bongiovi and Tom Erdelyi. After hearing of the recording session, Harrison was eager to join, and in January 1977, the trio went to his apartment in Ipswich to teach him their songs and play a few shows in the area.

In April, sessions for the album proper began in earnest at Sundragon Studios, with the group finally a foursome. Tony Bongiovi and Lance Quinn acted as co-producers on these sessions, with Ed Stasium as engineer. Frantz claims that Stasium did most of the work on the album, while Bongiovi took phone calls, read magazines, or talked about airplanes. Bongiovi was dissatisfied with the group's performances, often asking for seven or eight takes of a song, even after the best take had already been recorded. The group felt that Bongiovi was condescending, and that he was trying to make them sound like a different band. He was also repeatedly rude to bassist Tina Weymouth. Stasium and Quinn were full of encouragement for the group.

The first song to have vocals recorded was "Psycho Killer". Allegedly, during recording of this track, Bongiovi went into the studio kitchen and gave Byrne a knife, telling him to get into character when singing. Byrne simply responded with "No, that's not going to work" and the band took a break. During the break Byrne confessed that he felt uncomfortable singing with Bongiovi watching, and asked Stasium to remove him. Stasium suggested evasion, recording when Bongiovi was not around, before he arrived, or after he left. Bongiovi allegedly never noticed they were doing this, being more concerned with the building of Power Station Studios.

The group wanted the album to "Convey a modern message about the importance of taking charge of your own life", whilst still being fun to listen to.

Within two weeks the basic tracks were down, but still needed overdubs. Sessions were halted when Ken Kushnick, Sire's European representative, offered them a chance to tour Europe with the Ramones in order to promote their "Love → Building on Fire" single.

While on tour the group continued to develop their sound, and on May 14, performed at The Rock Garden in Covent Garden, London, where John Cale, Brian Eno and Chris Thomas saw them. Linda Stein, the Ramones' co-manager brought Cale, Eno and Thomas backstage after the concert where they all shook hands. Thomas allegedly heard Cale say to Eno "They're mine, you bugger!" All members of Talking Heads already knew Cale fairly well, as he had produced Jerry Harrison in 1972 for The Modern Lovers (1976), and was a regular at CBGBs throughout the original trio's growth.

After the meeting they all went to The Speak Club to drink and discuss. Thomas declined the opportunity to replace Bongiovi as producer for the remaining album sessions. When the group returned to the US on June 7, they booked a four-day recording session at ODO Studios in New York to record vocals and overdubs, as well as to mix the album. The album was finished.

Release history
The album was released by Sire Records in the UK and US and Philips Records throughout continental Europe.

In 2005, it was remastered and re-released by Warner Music Group on their Warner Bros./Sire Records/Rhino Records labels in DualDisc format with five bonus tracks on the CD side (see track listing below). The DVD-Audio side includes both stereo and 5.1 surround high resolution (96 kHz/24bit) mixes, as well as a Dolby Digital version and videos of the band performing "Pulled Up" and "I Feel It in My Heart". In Europe, it was released as a CD+DVDA two-disc set, rather than a single DualDisc. The reissue was produced by Andy Zax with Talking Heads.

The album was re-released on vinyl on April 18, 2009, for Record Store Day.

Critical reception

Reviewing for The Village Voice in 1977, Robert Christgau said that while "a debut LP will often seem overrefined to habitues of a band's scene", the more he listened to the album the more he believed "the Heads set themselves the task of hurdling such limitations", and succeeded with 77:

Record World said of the lead single "Uh-Oh, Love Comes to Town" that it;s "an r&b-based song with interesting steel drum work."

Talking Heads: 77 was voted the year's seventh best album in The Village Voices Pazz & Jop critics' poll.

In 2003, the album was ranked No. 290 on Rolling Stones list of "The 500 Greatest Albums of All Time", and 291 in a 2012 revised list.
The album was also included in the book 1001 Albums You Must Hear Before You Die.

Track listing

Personnel
Adapted from the album's liner notes.

Talking Heads
David Byrne – guitar, lead vocals, production
Chris Frantz – drums, steel pan, production
Jerry Harrison – guitar, keyboards, backing vocals, production
Tina Weymouth (credited as Martina Weymouth) – bass guitar, production

Additional musicians
Arthur Russell– cello on "Psycho Killer" (Acoustic Version)

Production
Tony Bongiovi – producer
Joe Gastwirt – mastering
Lance Quinn – producer
Mick Rock – photography
Ed Stasium – engineer

Charts

References

External links 
 

1977 debut albums
Albums produced by David Byrne
Albums produced by Chris Frantz
Albums produced by Jerry Harrison
Albums produced by Tina Weymouth
Albums produced by Tony Bongiovi
Albums with cover art by Mick Rock
Art punk albums
Philips Records albums
Sire Records albums
Talking Heads albums